Von Kries may refer to:

 Johannes von Kries
 Von Kries Coefficient Law